Boi Morto ("dead ox") is a bairro in the District of Sede in the municipality of Santa Maria, in the Brazilian state of Rio Grande do Sul. It is located in west Santa Maria.

Villages 
The bairro contains the following villages: Boi Morto, Rincão dos Bentos, Vila Boi Morto, Vila Cauduro, Vila Querência, Vila Santa Catarina.

Gallery of photos

References 

Bairros of Santa Maria, Rio Grande do Sul